María Florencia Bertotti (born 15 March 1983), better known as Florencia Bertotti is an Argentine actress, singer, songwriter and businesswoman.

Biography 
Florencia Bertotti parents are Gustavo Bertotti, a jeweler and María Candelaria Pérez Colman, a psychologist and a teacher of children with disabilities. Her parents divorced when Florencia was seven years old. She has an older sister called Clara Bertotti. Her father passed away in 1999 when she was filming the series Verano del '98. Florencia studied at the Colegio Nuestra Señora de la Misericordia in Recoleta, Buenos Aires, Argentina.

Personal life 
On 2 December 2006 she got married in a religious ceremony with Guido Kaczka, whom she met in the recordings of Verano del '98 and who was her boyfriend since then. On 10 July 2008, she gave birth to the couple's first child, a boy, whom they called Romeo Kaczka Bertottia.The couple divorced in March 2010. They both share custody of their son.

Since 2010, Florencia Bertotti is in a relationship with the actor, Federico Amador.

Career 
María Florencia Bertotti began her career in television with an advertising of jams Arcor in 1995. After several television advertisements, in 1995, she makes a small participation in the television series Dulce Ana.

In 1996, she makes a small participation in the television series 90 60 90 modelos.

From 1996 to 1998, she was part of the cast of the television series De corazón.

In 1998, she made her film debut, with a film of the students of the University of Cinema, Mala época. In 1998, she play the leading role of little Aneta in the movie El Faro.

From 1999 to 2000, she was part of the cast of the youth television series Verano del '98.

From 2000 to 2001, she was part of the cast of the television series
Luna salvaje.

In 2001, she was part of the cast of the television series Culpables. In 2001, she acted in the movie Déjala correr.

From 2002 to 2003, she was part of the cast of the television series Son amores.

In 2004, she was part of the cast of the television series Los pensionados.

From 2004 to 2005, she was the protagonist of the youth television series Floricienta with Juan Gil Navarro and Fabio Di Tomaso.

In late 2008, it was announced that Florencia Bertotti would return to television with a new telenovela targeted to children, which would be produced by her and her husband Guido Kaczka. From 2009 to 2010, she was the protagonist of the youth television series Niní with Federico Amador, this television series was produced and directed by her and her husband Guido Kaczka.

In 2010 she returned to the cinema with Igualita a mí produced by Patagonik which she stars alongside Adrián Suar.

In 2012, Florencia Bertotti played the co-starring role of Amparo Lacroix in the television series La Dueña.

In 2014, she was the protagonist of the television series Guapas with Mercedes Morán, Araceli González, Carla Peterson and Isabel Macedo. She composed the musical curtain for the series Guapas with Willie Lorenzo, which was interpreted by Fabiana Cantilo.

In 2016 Florencia Bertotti returns to television starring in the series Silencios de familia with Adrián Suar and Julieta Díaz.

In 2017, she acted in the movie Casi leyendas. In 2017, she composed the musical curtain for the series Las Estrellas with Willie Lorenzo, which was interpreted by Daniela Herrero. In 2017, she composed the musical curtain for the series Simona with Willie Lorenzo, which was interpreted by Ángela Torres.

In 2018, she directed the choreography for the opening of Bailando 2018 with the cast of the series Simona.

In 2019, she was part of the play 100 metros cuadrados with María Valenzuela and Stéfano de Gregorio directed by Manuel González Gil.

Other Work 
On 6 May 2013, Florencia Bertotti opened her own clothing store for children, babies and mothers, which she called Pancha Buenos Aires by Florencia Bertotti. On 15 March 2021, Florencia Bertotti launched a new space, which she called Pancha Recreo, this section contains reclaimed wood games, without batteries, without rules and without instructions to accompany the little ones in their different stages of development and growth. In this new section there is also a great variety of books for children of different ages, which were specially chosen and previously read by Florencia Bertotti.

Filmography

Television

Movies

Theater

Discography

Soundtrack albums 

 2004 — Floricienta
 2005 — Floricienta
 2007 — Floricienta

 2009 — Niní

Awards and nominations

References

External links 
 Italian Fansite 
 
 
 Spanish Fansite
 International Fansite
 Official Forum

1983 births
21st-century Argentine women singers
Argentine film actresses
Argentine people of Italian descent
Argentine people of Sicilian descent
Argentine stage actresses
Argentine telenovela actresses
Argentine television actresses
Living people
Actresses from Buenos Aires
Singers from Buenos Aires
20th-century Argentine actresses
21st-century Argentine actresses